The 1988 Atlanta Journal 500 was a NASCAR Winston Cup Series racing event that took place on November 20, 1988, at Atlanta International Raceway (located in the Atlanta suburb of Hampton, Georgia).

Background
Atlanta International Raceway (now Atlanta Motor Speedway) is one of ten current intermediate track to hold NASCAR races; the others are Charlotte Motor Speedway, Chicagoland Speedway, Darlington Raceway, Homestead Miami Speedway, Kansas Speedway, Kentucky Speedway, Las Vegas Motor Speedway, New Hampshire Motor Speedway, and Texas Motor Speedway. However, at the time, only Charlotte and Darlington were built.

The track's turns are banked at twenty-four degrees, while the front stretch, the location of the finish line, and the back stretch are banked at five.

Race report
One of the drivers who failed to qualify for this race was Bobby Coyle; who attempted to qualify in his #50 Pontiac machine.

Bill Elliott would earn his only NASCAR Winston Cup championship here despite not finishing in the top ten. However, Elliott consistently placed in the other races of the 1988 season with six wins, 15 finishes in the top five, and 10 finishes in the top ten.

The race took three hours and fifty-two minutes; resulting in a 4¼ second win by Rusty Wallace over Davey Allison. There was an unusually high attrition rate during this race; with 13 engine failures and only 20 of the 42 starters running at the finish. It would be contributed to the fact that the speedway was repaved since the previous race in the spring. Rusty Wallace was mad that Bill Elliott was running conservative since he only had to finish 18th to clinch the title. Rusty did everything that he could do, including leading the most laps. Elliott could've been more conservative than he was, over half the field blew motors or wrecked. 

Mike Alexander would finish third in this event; his best NASCAR Winston Cup Series performance. Neil Bonnett finished 13th in his final outing in the Rahmoc #75 Valvoline Pontiac.

Seventy-two thousand fans would see an average speed of  while Wallace qualified for the pole position with a speed of  - the equivalent of 30.525 seconds. Tommy Ellis would finish last after encountering a transmission problem on lap 2 out of 328. Nine cautions slowed the race for 55 laps. Cale Yarborough's last event went out with a respectable 10th as he would return as an owner of the Phillips #66.

NASCAR champion Benny Parsons and Brad Noffsinger would also compete in their final Monster Energy NASCAR Cup Series race here. Parsons would finish in 34th place while Noffsinger would finish in 26th place. This was the last race for Piedmont Airlines as a NASCAR Cup series sponsor, ending the company's partnership with the sport that began in 1981 and picked up momentum during a two-year stay at Richard Childress's team before joining Billy Hagen's team in 1984 for an extended run that began with Terry Laborite taking their car to a championship. The Piedmont brand was in the process of being phased out at the time as USAir had bought the company was rebranding the regional airline as part of its USAir Express operations. Sterling Marlin brought the white-and-blue #44 Oldsmobile home with a top-15 run in its last race. Hoss Ellington, Mike Curb, and Harry Ranier would end their respective careers as NASCAR owners after this race. The drivers would earn $387,785 in total race winnings ($ when adjusted for inflation).

Top 10 finishers

Timeline
Section reference: 
 Start of race: Rusty Wallace started out the race with the pole position.
 Lap 7: Caution due to Dale Jarrett's accident, ended on lap 12.
 Lap 26: Mandatory competition caution handed out by NASCAR officials, ended on lap 29.
 Lap 55: Caution due to debris, ended on lap 59.
 Lap 86: Caution due to Richard Petty's accident, ended on lap 92.
 Lap 108: Caution due to oil on the track, ended on lap 111.
 Lap 140: Caution due to Benny Parsons' accident, ended on lap 146.
 Lap 170: Caution due to oil on the track, ended on lap 174.
 Lap 209: Caution due to Harry Gant's accident, green flag racing resumed on lap 216.
 Lap 252: Caution due to Alan Kulwicki's accident, ended on lap 260.
 Lap 267: Kyle Petty managed to blow his engine.
 Lap 272: Larry Pearson managed to blow his engine.
 Lap 276: Mark Martin managed to blow his engine.
 Finish: Rusty Wallace was officially declared the winner of the event.

Standings after the race

References

Atlanta Journal 500
Atlanta Journal 500
NASCAR races at Atlanta Motor Speedway